The Mineral Belt National Recreation Trail is an 11.6 mile all-season biking/walking trail that loops around Leadville, Colorado and through its historic mining district. The trail's setting is quintessentially Colorado Rocky Mountain landscape. Groves of aspen, conifer forests, wildflower meadows, and open vista sage parks are interspersed with once-booming mine sites. Ever-present views of the  Sawatch and  Mosquito mountain ranges provide perspective and a sense of permanence to the area. Several signs along the way provide historical snippets about Leadville's colorful past. When the snow falls,  snowcats groom the trail to provide access to  Nordic skiers,  snowshoers and  winter-bikers.   

About six miles of this trail meanders through the historic Leadville Mining District. In part the trail follows old mining-camp railbeds. "What makes this trail unique is that it goes through one of the greatest mining districts in the world," says Lake County, Colorado Assessor Howard A. Tritz, an original member of the group which spearheaded trail development. "It has some of the best scenery anywhere, and it's accessible and available to everyone, visitors and locals alike, regardless of age or ability."

References

Sources and external links
Mineral Belt Trail's Website
The Mineral Belt Trail, Leadville, Colorado 

Protected areas of Lake County, Colorado
National Recreation Trails in Colorado